Yangzhuang Subdistrict is a subdistrict located on northwestern side of Tongzhou District, Beijing. It shares border with Beiyuan Subdistrict to the north, Jiukeshu Subdistrict to the east, Liyuan Town to the south, and Heizhuanghu Township to the west.

The subdistrict was created in 2020.

Administrative divisions 

As of 2021, Yangzhuang Subdistrict was divided into 16 communities:

Gallery

See also 
 List of township-level divisions of Beijing

References 

Tongzhou District, Beijing
Subdistricts of Beijing